Burlap & Satin is the twenty-fifth solo studio album by American entertainer Dolly Parton. It was released on May 2, 1983, by RCA Records. The album straddled the line between pop and country sounds. Consisting mostly of Parton's own compositions, two tracks were outtakes from the Best Little Whorehouse in Texas film:  "A Cowboy's Ways" (a song intended for costar Burt Reynolds to perform in the film that was ultimately cut out of the film) and "A Gamble Either Way".  The album's single, "Potential New Boyfriend" was a top 20 country single and was accompanied by Parton's first ever music video.  Willie Nelson duetted on a cover of the Eddy Arnold hit "I Really Don't Want to Know". The track "Ooo-eee" was recorded by Nicolette Larson on her 1980 album, "Radioland" and features backing vocals from Linda Ronstadt.

As part of Parton's 2007 European tour, the album was re-released for the first time on CD by BMG Germany (a division of Sony/BMG) in a two-fer CD. It was paired with 1985's Real Love.

Critical reception
Billboard gave a positive review of the album, calling it "Parton's most satisfying album in a long time." The review said the album was "well-titled...because [Parton] glides silkily between pop (which she handles like a trouper) and the kind of country on which her superstar career was formulated." They praised the inclusion of six Parton originals because "no one sings Parton better than Parton." The review also praised Perry's arrangements, calling them "beautiful and classy, contemporary but soulful, exactly right for Parton's shivering vibrato." The review concluded by saying that the album "will rank among Dolly's best yet."

Cashbox also gave a positive review, praising Parton's ability of "moving freely between folksy country, gospel, and danceable pop." The review said that the six Parton-penned songs are "clearly the strongest pieces in the collection, while the other four cuts provide the most interesting production elements." The review also interpreted the album title, artwork, and material selection as Parton "attempting to lump both her small-town country girl sensibilities and bigger-than-life celebrity status together...denoting her ability to reach a wide and varied audience."

Track listing

Chart performance
Album

Album (Year-End)

Personnel
Dolly Parton - vocals
Eddy Anderson, Rick Marotta - drums
Eddy Anderson - percussion
Anita Ball, Dolly Parton, Ernie Winfrey, Judy Ogle, Judy Rodman - handclaps
Leland Sklar, Michael Rhodes, Tommy Cogbill - bass
Gregg Perry, Mitch Humphries, Robbie Buchanan, Ron Oates, Dolly Parton - keyboards
Ron Oates - synthesizers
Hugh McCracken, Marty Walsh, Michael Severs, Pete Bordonali, Tom Rutledge - guitar
Joe McGuffee - steel guitar
Denis Solee - saxophone, flute
Dewayne Pigg - French horn
Nashville String Machine - strings
 Anita Ball, Donna McElroy, Judy Rodman, Karen Taylor-Good, Lea Jane Berinati, Lisa Silver, Michael Black, Ray Walker, Richard Dennison - Backing vocals

Production
Arranged & Produced By Dolly Parton & Gregg Perry
Recorded & Engineered By Ernie Winfrey & Phil Jamtaas
Assistant Engineers: Fran Overall, Jim Scott
Mixed By Ernie Winfrey

References

External links
Burlap & Satin at Dolly Parton On-Line
"Burlap & Satin" at discogs

Dolly Parton albums
1983 albums
RCA Records albums